Atyphella ellioti is a species of firefly in the genus Atyphella. It is native to Australia.

References

Lampyridae
Bioluminescent insects
Beetles described in 2000
Beetles of Australia